The 2020 FIBA Men's Olympic Qualifying Tournament in Split was one of four 2020 FIBA Men's Olympic Qualifying Tournaments. The tournament was held in Split, Croatia. It was originally scheduled to take place from 23 to 28 June 2020 but was postponed due to the COVID-19 pandemic, to 29 June to 4 July 2021.

Owing to doping violations, Russia is ineligible to compete in the 2020 Summer Olympics. Had Russia won the final, it would have competed under the acronym ROC.

Teams

Venue

Squads

Preliminary round
All times are local (UTC+2).

Group A

Group B

Final round

Semi-finals

Final

Final ranking

References

External links
Official website
Tournament summary

Qualifying
2020–21 in Croatian basketball
Sports competitions in Split, Croatia
Impact of the COVID-19 pandemic on the 2020 Summer Olympics
International basketball competitions hosted by Croatia
June 2021 sports events in Croatia
July 2021 sports events in Croatia